Dercetis (meaning "throat whale") is a genus of prehistoric ray-finned fish.

References

 paleodb.org

Prehistoric aulopiformes
Prehistoric ray-finned fish genera
Prehistoric fish of Africa
Cretaceous bony fish